The following is a list of notable individuals who were born in and/or have lived in Reston, Virginia.

Arts and entertainment
 Donna Andrews, mystery fiction writer
 Stephen Bidwell, drummer for Black Pumas and Hardproof.
 Big Pooh, MC in the hip hop group Little Brother; attended South Lakes High School
 Benny Blanco, born Benjamin Levin, songwriter and producer who has worked with artists such as Katy Perry, Britney Spears, and 3OH!3
 Roy Buchanan, guitarist and blues musician
 Matt Duke (born 1985), singer-songwriter/musician; signed to Rykodisc; has released multiple albums; born in Reston
 Jeremy Gelbwaks, child actor from The Partridge Family
 Evan Helmuth, actor (The Devil Inside, Fever Pitch, Jobs); raised in Reston
 Michael Hersch, composer and pianist
 Lubomir Kavalek, chess grandmaster
 George Taylor Morris, radio host who popularized the "Dark Side of the Rainbow" phenomenon
 Steve Niles (born 1965 in Jackson Township, New Jersey), comic book author, screenwriter and punk rock musician; grew up in Reston
 Jacob Sartorius, singer and internet personality
 Eddie Timanus (born 1968 in St. Joseph, Missouri), Jeopardy! champion; USA Today sportswriter; grew up in Reston
 Lynd Ward, artist

Business
 Stephanie Hannon, developer of Google Wave, first female technology officer of a major political campaign
 Michael Pocalyko, businessman, entrepreneur and author
 Robert E. Simon, founder of Reston, has lived around the Lake Anne area since 1993

Crime
 Lloyd R. Woodson, arrested in 2010 with military-grade illegal weapons he intended to use in a violent crime, and a detailed map of the Fort Drum military installation

Politics and government
 Randy Babbitt, former administrator of the Federal Aviation Administration
 Milt Bearden, retired Central Intelligence Agency officer; author (The Black Tulip, The Main Enemy); frequent contributor to the New York Times, Los Angeles Times and Wall Street Journal
 T. Keith Glennan, first Administrator of NASA
 Kenneth R. Plum (D), Virginia House of Delegates Democratic Caucus leader, represents Reston
 Howard Wolpe, former member of the United States House of Representatives

Science
 Gordon P. Eaton, geologist
 Arnold Kramish, nuclear physicist who worked on the Manhattan Project

Sports
 Maame Biney, US Olympic Speed Skater in the 2018 Winter Olympics
 Grant Hill, NBA player for the Phoenix Suns; attended South Lakes High School
 Paul Mulvey, former professional hockey player
 Kevin Payne, former president of D.C. United
 Eddie Royal, NFL wide receiver for the Chicago Bears; played football for one season at South Lakes High School
 Michael Shabaz, professional tennis player
 Wyatt Toregas, MLB player, Cleveland Indians and Pittsburgh Pirates
 Alan Webb, professional track athlete; holder of the American record in the mile run; attended South Lakes High School
 Carlos Yates, George Mason University nationally ranked top scoring basketball player; record holder; attended Flint Hill School

References

Reston, Virginia
Reston